Szépjuhászné ( from 1945 to 1992 Ságvári-liget ) is a small clearing in the 2nd district of Budapest, in the saddle between Hárshegy and János-hegy.

Background
It is the site of the Pauline Monastery where the Pauline Order founded their first friary.

It is a starting point for hikers into the Buda Hills.

References

External links 
 

Hegyvidék
Buda Hills